The D-class (Avon S650) lifeboat was a sub-class of 4 inflatable boats operated as part of the D-class between 1971 and 1986 by the Royal National Lifeboat Institution of the United Kingdom and Ireland. It was superseded by the D-class lifeboat (Zodiac III).

Utilization
There were only 4 Avon S650 utilised by the RNLI as part of the D-class, the workhorse of the RNLI inshore lifeboat (rescue) (ILB) fleet. Significantly smaller in comparison to the rest of the inshore fleet, the D-class is also one of the few RNLI types not to feature a rigid hull. The main aspect of the boat would be both its size and weight, the D-class was specifically designed as a light and highly manoeuvrable rapid response craft.

Design and construction
The D-class lifeboat consists of two sponsons, together housing four inflatable segments intersected by baffles.

This was one of the smaller classes of lifeboat operated by the RNLI, and while there were only 4 Avon S650s in the fleet, the D-class were a common sight at lifeboat stations around the coast. Unlike other members of the ILB fleet, the D-class does not have a rigid hull; all others, with the exception of the Arancia, hovercraft and ALB Tenders, are Rigid Inflatable Boats (RIBs).

Fleet

References

External links

RNLI Fleet
RNLI Lifeboats

Royal National Lifeboat Institution lifeboats
Inflatable boats